Salginatobel Bridge is a reinforced concrete arch bridge designed by Swiss civil engineer Robert Maillart. It was constructed across an alpine ravine in the grisonian Prättigau, belonging to the municipality of Schiers, in Switzerland between 1929 and 1930. In 1991, it was declared an International Historic Civil Engineering Landmark, the thirteenth such structure and the first concrete bridge so designated.

As with his Schwandbach Bridge and Vessy Bridge, the structure's fame among civil engineers is a consequence of the techniques involved and the elegance of its design rather than its prominent location: it connects the village Schiers – on valley floor of the route between Landquart and Davos – with the alpine hamlet Schuders of almost 100 people, where the alpine post road ends, but is often visited by designers.

Design and history 
Maillart had previously designed a three-hinged arch bridge over the Rhine at Tavanasa in 1904. In the  span Tavanasa bridge, the arch is thinnest at its crown and springing points, thickening in between to reflect the shape of its bending moment diagram. This bridge was destroyed by an avalanche in September 1927. Although Maillart didn't win the contract for a replacement bridge, he entered a competition the following year for the bridge at Salginatobel, with a three-hinged arch spanning  that used the same overall form as at Tavanasa. In conjunction with contractor Florian Prader, Maillart's design was the least expensive of nineteen entries.

The falsework was built by the Graubünden carpenter Richard Coray in late summer 1929, and the rest of the construction started in 1930.  The bridge was officially opened on 18 August 1930.

Although regarded as a pioneering work, several aspects of its construction lacked durability, such as the absence of bridge deck waterproofing, low concrete cover and poor drainage. In 1975 and 1976 it was extensively repaired, the parapets were modified, and waterproofing was added. However, by 1991, deterioration had continued, with the parapets becoming unsafe. The waterproofing and drainage were replaced and amended, and most of the existing concrete surface removed and replaced by shotcrete. The parapets were completely rebuilt. Completed in 1998, this repair work cost 1.3 million US dollars.

Praise and criticism 
 1947, the bridge was featured with other of Maillart's works in a four-month exhibit at the Museum of Modern Art, New York
 Salginatobel Bridge was designated a Swiss heritage site of national significance.
 1991, it was designated an International Historic Civil Engineering Landmark by the American Society of Civil Engineers

The bridge has received widespread attention since its innovative design and construction, including considerable praise from other bridge engineers, architects and architectural historians. Writing in 2000, Heinrich Figi said:

David P. Billington has been particularly enthusiastic about the bridge:

The German bridge engineer Fritz Leonhardt has suggested that:

Maillart was not entirely satisfied with the bridge, writing after its completion that its soffit should have been a pointed rather than a pure curved arch, if it were properly to match his structural analysis:

Image gallery

References 
 ASCE page on the bridge
 Billington, David P. Maillart and the Salginatobel Bridge. Structural Engineering International, 1/1991.
 Billington, David P. The Tower and the Bridge. Princeton University Press, Princeton, USA, 1983. 
 Billington, David P. Robert Maillart and the Art of Reinforced Concrete. The MIT Press. Cambridge, USA, 1990. .
 Billington, David P. The Art of Structural Design: A Swiss Legacy. Princeton University Art Museum. Princeton, USA, 2003. .
 Figi, Heinrich. Rehabilitation of the Salginatobel Bridge. Structural Engineering International, 1/2000.
 Leonhardt, Fritz. Bridges: Aesthetics and Design. The MIT Press, Cambridge, USA, 1984. 
 Maillart, Robert. Construction and Aesthetic of Bridges. The Concrete Way, May–June 1935.

Notes

External links 

  (includes construction photo)
 ASCE: Salginatobel Bridge
 Great Buildings Online
 Sightseeing Graubünden, Switzerland, official tourism board suggestions and location

Deck arch bridges
Bridges completed in 1930
Road bridges in Switzerland
Monuments and memorials in Switzerland
Historic Civil Engineering Landmarks
Concrete bridges
Schiers
20th-century architecture in Switzerland